Russian-occupied territories of Ukraine are areas of Ukraine that are currently controlled by Russia in the course of the Russo-Ukrainian war. In Ukrainian law, they are defined as the "temporarily occupied territories of Ukraine".

The occupation started in 2014 following Russia's invasion and annexation of the Crimean peninsula, and its assisting the forces of the mostly unrecognized Donetsk and Luhansk People's Republics in capturing parts of the Donetsk and Luhansk oblasts during the war in Donbas. In 2022, Russian forces initiated a full-scale invasion of the nation and successfully occupied more territory throughout the country. However, due to continued fierce Ukrainian resistance, coupled with logistical challenges (e.g. the stalled Russian Kyiv convoy), the Russian Armed Forces announced their withdrawal from Chernihiv, Kyiv, Sumy, and Zhytomyr oblasts in early April.

In early September 2022, Ukrainian forces ended the months-long stalemate on the front lines with a successful counteroffensive in the Kharkiv region, inflicting a major defeat on Russian forces by forcing their retreat. Then later in November, Ukrainian forces once again achieved a major success with a southern counteroffensive retaking the city of Kherson on 11 November.

On 30 September 2022, Russia announced the annexation of Donetsk, Kherson, Luhansk and Zaporizhzhia oblasts, despite only occupying part of the claimed territory. The UN General Assembly responded by passing a resolution rejecting this annexation as illegal and upholding Ukraine's right to territorial integrity.

Background

With the Euromaidan and Revolution of Dignity since November 2013, popular protests across Ukraine led to the dismissal of pro-Russian Ukrainian president Viktor Yanukovych by the Verkhovna Rada (Ukraine's parliament), as he fled to Russia. The growing pro-European sentiment at the center of this period of upheaval caused unease in the Kremlin, and Russian president Vladimir Putin immediately mobilized Russian army and airborne forces to invade Crimea, and they swiftly took control of major government buildings and blockaded the Ukrainian military in their bases across the peninsula. Soon after, Russian-installed officials announced and carried out a referendum for the region to join Russia, which western and independent organizations labeled as illegitimate. The Kremlin rejected these claims and soon officially annexed Crimea into Russia, with western nations issuing sanctions against Russia in response. In addition, with pro-Russian counter-protests across Eastern and Southern Ukraine in response to the ousting of Yanukovych, Russia allegedly supported Russian and pro-Russian militant separatists in the Donbas region in taking control of major government buildings. These separatists eventually created the Donetsk and Luhansk People's Republics, and have since been at conflict with the now-pro-European Ukrainian government, known as the war in Donbas (Russia announced their "annexation" after the 2022 Russian invasion of Ukraine).

In response to Russian military intervention, the Parliament of Ukraine adopted government laws (with further updates and extensions) to qualify the Autonomous Republic of Crimea and parts of Donetsk and Luhansk regions as temporarily occupied and uncontrolled territories:

 Autonomous Republic of Crimea:
 Law of Ukraine No. 1207-VII (15 April 2014) "Assurance of Citizens' Rights and Freedom, and Legal Regulations on Temporarily Occupied Territory of Ukraine".
 Separate Raions of Donetsk and Luhansk Oblasts:
 Order of the Cabinet of Ministers of Ukraine No. 1085-р (7 November 2014) "A List of Settlements on Territory Temporarily Uncontrolled by Government Authorities, and a List of Landmarks Located at the Contact Line".
 Law of Ukraine No. 254-19-VIII (17 March 2015) "On Recognition of Separate Raions, Cities, Towns and Villages in Donetsk and Luhansk Regions as Temporarily Occupied Territories".
Petro Poroshenko, one of the opposition leaders during Euromaidan, won a landslide victory in the election to succeed interim president Turchynov, three months after the ousting of Yanukovych.

Before February 2022
Since Russia annexed Crimea in March 2014, it administers the peninsula under two federal subjects: the Republic of Crimea and the federal city of Sevastopol. Ukraine continues to claim the peninsula as an integral part of its territory, which is supported by most foreign governments through the United Nations General Assembly Resolution 68/262, even though Russia and some other UN member states have expressed support for the 2014 Crimean referendum, implying recognition of Crimea as part of the Russian Federation. In 2015, the Ukrainian parliament officially set 20 February 2014 as the date of "the beginning of the temporary occupation of Crimea and Sevastopol by Russia".

The uncontrolled portions of the Donetsk and Luhansk Oblasts are commonly abbreviated as "ORDLO" from Ukrainian, especially among Ukrainian news media. ("certain areas of Donetsk and Luhansk Oblasts") The term first appeared in Law of Ukraine №1680-VII (October 2014). Documents of the Minsk Protocol and the OSCE refer to them as "certain areas of Donetsk and Luhansk regions" (CADLR) of Ukraine.

The Ministry of Reintegration of Temporarily Occupied Territories is the Ukrainian government ministry that oversees government policy towards the regions. , the government considered 7% of Ukraine's territory to be under occupation. The United Nations General Assembly resolution 73/194, adopted on 17 December 2018, designated Crimea as under "temporary occupation".

The Ukrainian army was concerned in 2019 about the deployment of 3M-54 Kalibr cruise missiles on Russian naval and coast guard vessels operating in the Sea of Azov, which is adjacent to the temporarily occupied territories. As a result, Mariupol and Berdiansk, two main Pryazovian seaports, suffer from an increase in insecurity (both cities were captured in 2022).

Temryuk and Taganrog, two other ports on the Sea of Azov, have allegedly been used to disguise the provenance of anthracite coal and liquefied natural gas (LNG) from the temporarily occupied territories.

Territories affected 

Since the start of the Russo-Ukrainian War in 2014, the Government of Ukraine is issuing (as extension to government order no. 1085-р and law no. 254-VIII) up-to-date "List of Temporarily Occupied Regions and Settlements" and a "List of Landmarks Bordering the Anti-Terrorist Operation Zone". As of 16 September 2020, the Cabinet of Ministers of Ukraine has made four updates to order no. 1085-р and law no. 254-VIII:
 Addendum No. 128-р as of 18 February 2015
 Addendum No. 428-р as of 5 May 2015
 Addendum No. 1276-р as of 2 December 2015
 Addendum No. 79-р as of 7 February 2018
 Addendum No. 410-р as of 13 June 2018
 Addendum No. 505-р as of 5 July 2019
 Addendum No. 1125-р as of 16 September 2020

Some settlements' names are the result of 2016 Decommunization in Ukraine.

The list below is based on the extension as of 7 February 2018. The borders of some raions have changed since 2015.
 Autonomous Republic of Crimea (entire region)
 Donetsk Oblast
 Cities of regional importance and nearby settlements:
 Donetsk
 Horlivka
 Debaltseve
 Dokuchaievsk
 Yenakiieve
 Zhdanivka
 Khrestivka (before 2016: Kirovske)
 Makiivka
 Snizhne
 Chystiakove (before 2016: Torez)
 Khartsyzk
 Shakhtarsk
 Ridkodub
 Yasynuvata
 Amvrosiivka Raion (all settlements)
 Bakhmut Raion (before 2016: Artemivsk Raion):
 Bulavynske
 Vuhlehirsk
 Oleksandrivske
 Olenivka
 Vesela Dolyna
 Danylove
 Illinka
 Kamianka
 Bulavyne
 Hrozne
 Kaiutyne
 Vozdvyzhenka (before 2016: Krasnyi Pakhar)
 Stupakove (before 2016: Krasnyi Pakhar)
 Savelivka
 Debaltsivske (before 2016: Komuna)
 Kalynivka
 Lohvynove
 Novohryhorivka
 Nyzhnie Lozove
 Sanzharivka
 Olkhovatka
 Pryberezhne
 Dolomitne
 Travneve
 Lozove
 Volnovakha Raion:
 Andriivka
 Dolia
 Liubivka
 Malynove
 Molodizhne
 Novomykolaivka
 Nova Olenivka
 Petrivske
 Chervone
 Pikuzy
 Mariinka Raion:
 Kreminets
 Luhanske
 Oleksandrivka
 Staromykhailivka
 Syhnalne
 Novoazovsk Raion (all settlements)
 Starobesheve Raion (all settlements)
 Boikivske Raion (before 2016: Telmanove Raion) (all settlements)
 Shakhtarsk Raion (all settlements)
 Yasynuvata Raion:
 Vesele
 Bétmanove (before 2016: Krasnyi Partyzan)
 Mineralne
 Spartak
 Yakovlivka
 Kruta Balka
 Kashtanove
 Lozove
 Vasylivka
 Luhansk Oblast
 Cities of regional importance and nearby settlements:
 Luhansk
 Alchevsk
 Antratsyt
 Brianka
 Holubivka (before 2016: Kirovsk)
 Khrustalnyi (before 2016: Krasnyi Luch)
 Sorokyne (before 2016: Krasnodon)
 Pervomaisk (known as Oleksandrivka)
 Rovenky
 Dovzhansk (before 2016: Sverdlovsk)
 Kadiivka (before 2016: Stakhanov)
 Antratsyt Raion (all settlements)
 Sorokyne Raion (before 2016: Krasnodon Raion) (all settlements)
 Lutuhyne Raion (all settlements)
 Novoaidar Raion:
 Sokilnyky
 Perevalsk Raion (all settlements)
 Popasna Raion:
 Berezivske
 Holubivske
 Zholobok
 Kalynove
 Kalynove-Borshchuvate
 Kruhlyk
 Molodizhne
 Mius
 Novooleksandrivka
 Chornukhyne
 Zolote (except Zolote-1,2,3,4)
 Dovzhánsk Raion (before 2016: Sverdlovsk Raion) (all settlements)
 Slovianoserbsk Raion (all settlements)
 Stanytsia Luhanska Raion:
 Burchak-Mykhailivka
 Lobacheve
 Mykolaivka
 Sukhodil
 Sevastopol (entire city)

Since the 2022 invasion 

After Russia's full-scale invasion in February 2022, the Russian military and Russian proxy forces further occupied additional Ukrainian territory. By early April, Russian forces withdrew from Northern Ukraine, including the capital Kyiv, after stagnating progress amid fierce Ukrainian resistance in order to focus on consolidating control over Eastern and Southern Ukraine. On June 2, 2022, Zelenskyy announced that Russia occupied approximately 20% of Ukrainian territory.

Kharkiv Oblast 

 Read more: Russian occupation of Kharkiv Oblast

The occupation began on February 24, 2022, immediately after Russian troops invaded Ukraine and began seizing parts of the Kharkiv Oblast. Since April, Russian forces tried to consolidate control in the region and capture the major city of Kharkiv after their withdrawal from Northern Ukraine. However, by mid-May, the Ukrainian forces pushed the Russians back towards the periphery of the Russian border, indicating that Ukrainians continue to garner stiff resistance against Russian advances. In early September 2022, Ukrainian forces began a major counteroffensive and by 11 September 2022, Russia had retreated from most of the settlements it previously occupied in the oblast, and the Russian Ministry of Defense announced a formal withdrawal of Russian forces from nearly all of Kharkiv Oblast stating that an "operation to curtail and transfer troops" was underway." The last remaining Russian forces fled the oblast on 3 October 2022, though a small portion on the eastern part of the oblast is still controlled by Russia.

Kherson Oblast 

 Read more: Russian occupation of Kherson Oblast

On February 24, 2022, Russian troops from Crimea invaded Henichesk and Skadovsk Raions. During the first days of the offensive, the Russians surrounded most of the cities and towns in the oblast, blocking the entrances to them with roadblocks, but not entering the cities themselves. Significant battles were fought for the Antonivskyi Bridge, which crosses the Dnipro River between Russian positions on the South bank and the Ukrainian city of Kherson on the North bank. The Russian military's overwhelming firepower forced the Ukrainian forces to retreat, and the city fell to Russian control on March 2. On June 29, the Russian occupation authorities in Kherson Oblast announced preparations for holding a referendum of annexation. On July 9, the Ukrainian government announced preparations for an imminent counteroffensive in the South, and urged the residents of occupied parts of Kherson and Zaporizhzhia Oblasts to shelter or evacuate to minimize civilian casualties in the operation. Following the destruction of the Antonivskyi Bridge and the advance of Ukrainian troops from the west, the lack of sustainable supply lines amid heavy Ukrainian shelling compelled the Russian forces to retreat. They eventually retreated from all areas on the North bank of the Dnipro River, including the city of Kherson, which the Ukrainian forces recaptured soon after, known as the liberation of Kherson.

Raions of Kherson Oblast that are occupied:

 Henichesk Raion
 Kakhovka Raion
 Skadovsk Raion
 Half of Kherson Raion

Zaporizhzhia Oblast 

 Read more: Russian occupation of Zaporizhzhia Oblast

On February 26, 2022, the city of Berdiansk came under the control of the Russian Federation, followed by Melitopol on March 1 after fierce fighting between Russian and Ukrainian forces. Russian troops also besieged and captured the city of Enerhodar, where the Zaporizhzhia Nuclear Power Plant is located, which came under the control of the Russian Federation on March 4. Since July, there have been increased tensions around the power plant as both Russia and Ukraine accuse each other of missile strikes around the plant, causing fears of a potential repeat of the Chernobyl Disaster.

Raions of Zaporizhzhia Oblast that are occupied:

 Melitopol Raion
 Berdiansk Raion
 Most of Vasylivka Raion
 Most of Polohy Raion

Donetsk Oblast 

 Read more: Russian occupation of Donetsk Oblast

Since the invasion, the Russian military, along with the Russian-backed Donetsk People's Republic, built on territorial gains they have made during the war in Donbas and captured additional territory, most significantly the port of Mariupol after a prolonged siege.

By February 24, 2022, the following raions of Donetsk Oblast were occupied:

 Horlivka Raion
 Donetsk Raion
 Kalmiuske Raion

After February 24, 2022, the following raions of Donetsk Oblast were captured:

 Mariupol Raion
 Half of Volnovakha Raion
 Eastern portions of Bakhmut Raion

Luhansk Oblast 
Read more: Luhansk People's Republic and Russian occupation of Luhansk Oblast

By February 24, 2022, the following raions of Luhansk Oblast were occupied:

 Alchevsk Raion
 Dovzhansk Raion
 Luhansk Raion
 Rovenky Raion

After February 24, 2022, the following raions of Luhansk Oblast were captured:

 Shchastia Raion
 Staroblisk Raion
 Most of Svatove Raion
 Most of Sievierodonetsk Raion

On July 3, 2022, the Russian military claimed that the entire Luhansk Oblast has been "liberated", suggesting that Russian forces has succeeded in occupying the entire oblast and marked a major milestone for their goal of capturing the Donbas in Eastern Ukraine.

However, by September 19, Ukraine recaptured Bilohorivka. By early October, Ukrainian forces have liberated several more settlements as their counteroffensive operations shifts focus into the main territory of the oblast, specifically the half north of the Siverskyi Donets in the Battle of the Svatove–Kreminna line.

Mykolaiv Oblast 
Read more: Russian occupation of Mykolaiv Oblast

The occupation of Mykolaiv Oblast began on February 26, 2022 with Russian troops crossing into the oblast through the Kherson Oblast from Crimea. In March, Russia attempted to advance towards Voznesensk, Mykolaiv and Nova Odesa, but were met with stiff resistance and failed. By May, Russia occupied Snihurivka, Tsentralne, Novopetrivka and numerous other small villages within the oblast. All these were retaken on 10–11 November 2022 during the Ukrainian counteroffensive, which followed the withdrawal of Russian troops from the right bank of the Dnieper.

Raions of Mykolaiv Oblast that are occupied:

  Extreme southern portion of Mykolaiv Raion (Kinburn Peninsula)

Formerly occupied territories 

 
After Russia's complete invasion in 2022 February, the Ukrainian military fiercely confronted the threat, and successfully prevented Russian forces from capturing Kyiv and forming a pro-Russian puppet government. In addition to the failed offensive to the capital, by late March, Russian forces were also stalled in advances in other major cities like Chernihiv, Sumy, Kharkiv, and Mariupol. As a result, the Russian Ministry of Defence decided to withdraw its military from the Northern and Northeastern offensives, instead focusing on consolidating control over Southern and Eastern Ukraine. By early April, both sides have confirmed the partial Russian withdrawal.

Chernihiv Oblast 
Read more: Russian occupation of Chernihiv Oblast

Russia started the occupation as part of the Northeastern offensive in the invasion of Ukraine in February 2022. The occupying forces occupied a large part of the oblast, and eventually laid siege to the oblast capital, but failed to capture the city. Eventually, the their stagnant progress led to their complete withdrawal from the oblast by early April, ending the occupation.

Kyiv Oblast 
Read more: Russian occupation of Kyiv Oblast

Russia started the occupation as part of the Northern offensive in the invasion of Ukraine in February 2022. Russian troops occupied a large part of the oblast, even approaching the borders of Kyiv city proper. However, the invaders' stagnant progress led to their failure to capture the Ukrainian capital, and eventually led to a complete withdrawal from the oblast by early April, ending the occupation.

Odesa Oblast 
Read more: 2022 Snake Island campaign

From 24 February to 30 June 2022, Russian forces occupied Snake Island in Odesa Oblast, but later withdrew after suffering heavy missile, artillery and drone strikes from the Ukrainian forces.

Sumy Oblast 
Read more: Russian occupation of Sumy Oblast

Russia started the occupation as part of the Northeastern offensive in the invasion of Ukraine in February 2022. The Russian military occupied a large part of the oblast, but failed to take the oblast capital. Eventually, the stagnant progress of the Russian Ground Forces led to their complete withdrawal from the oblast by early April, ending the occupation.

Zhytomyr Oblast 
Read more: Russian occupation of Zhytomyr Oblast

Russia started the occupation as part of the Northern offensive in the invasion of Ukraine in February 2022. The Russians occupied a small portion of the oblast, and never attempted to capture the oblast capital. Eventually, the occupiers' stagnant progress led to their complete withdrawal from the oblast by early April, ending the occupation.

International reactions

On 20 April 2016 Ukraine officially established government Ministry of Temporarily Occupied Territories and Internally Displaced Persons. It was subsequently renamed the Temporarily Occupied Territories, IDPs and veterans and then the Ministry of Reintegration of Temporarily Occupied Territories. The current minister is Iryna Vereshchuk, appointed on 4 November 2021.

In March 2014, in a vote at the United Nations, 100 member states out of 193 did not recognize the annexation of the Crimea by Russia, with only Armenia, Belarus, Bolivia, Cuba, Nicaragua, North Korea, Russia, Sudan, Syria, Venezuela, Zimbabwe voting against the resolution (See United Nations General Assembly Resolution 68/262.)

The United Nations passed three resolutions regarding the issue of "human rights in the Autonomous Republic of Crimea and the city of Sevastopol", first in December 2016, then again a year later in December 2017, and lastly yet another in December 2018.

The UN's position according to the resolution adopted in 2018:

In April 2018 PACE's emergency assembly recognized occupied regions of Ukraine as "territories under effective control by the Russian Federation". Chairman of the Ukrainian delegation to PACE, MP Volodymyr Aryev mentioned that recognition of the fact that part of the occupied Donbas is under Russia's control is so important for Ukraine. "The responsibility for all the crimes committed in the uncontrolled territories is removed from Ukraine. Russia becomes responsible", Aryev wrote on Facebook.

In early March 2022, in response to Russia's invasion, the United Nations General Assembly convened an emergency special session to discuss the latest developments regarding the peace situation in Ukraine, and adopted the United Nations General Assembly Resolution ES-11/1 to condemn Russia's invasion and Belarus's involvement.

See also 
 Anti-terrorist Operation Zone
 List of military occupations
 Malaysia Airlines Flight 17 shootdown
 Occupied territories of Georgia
 Russian military presence in Transnistria
 Russian-occupied territories
 Territorial control during the Russo-Ukrainian War
 Russian temporary administrative agencies in occupied Ukraine

References

War in Donbas
Disputed territories in Europe
Russia–Ukraine relations
History of Donetsk Oblast
History of Luhansk Oblast